"Hail to the Chief" is the personal anthem of the president of the United States, adapted by James Sanderson from an original Scottish Gaelic melody.

The song's playing accompanies the appearance of the president of the United States at many public events; it is also played at inauguration ceremonies. For major official occasions, the United States Marine Band and other military ensembles are generally the performers, so directives of the United States Department of Defense have, since 1954, been the main basis for according it official status. It is preceded by four ruffles and flourishes when played for the president. The song is also played during a former President's state funeral after the casket is removed from the hearse. As it originated in the 19th century, the song is in the public domain due to its age.

History
Verses from Sir Walter Scott's 1810 narrative poem The Lady of the Lake, including "The Boat Song" ("Hail to the Chief") with which the clan welcomes the arrival by boat of their chieftain Roderick Dhu, were set to music around 1812 by the songwriter James Sanderson (c. 1769 – c. 1841); a self-taught English violinist and the conductor of the Surrey Theatre, London, who wrote many songs for local theatrical productions during the 1790s and the early years of the 19th century:

Scott's romance was quickly made into unauthorized romantic melodramas. In November 1810, Scott wrote to a friend that The Lady of the Lake was being made into a play by Martin and Reynolds in London and by a Mr. Siddons in Edinburgh. About the same time, Scott received a letter from a friend and army officer who ended his note with a copy of the music of the Boat Song, "Hail to the Chief."

A version of Lady of the Lake debuted in New York May 8, 1812, and "Hail to the Chief" was published in Philadelphia about the same time as 'March and Chorus in the Dramatic Romance of the Lady of the Lake. Many parodies appeared, an indication of great popularity.

Association with the president first occurred in 1815, when it was played to honor both George Washington and the end of the War of 1812 (under the name "Wreaths for the Chieftain"). On July 4, 1828, the U.S. Marine Band performed the song at a ceremony for the formal opening of the Chesapeake and Ohio Canal, which was attended by President John Quincy Adams. Andrew Jackson was the first living President to have the song used to honor his position in 1829, and it was played at Martin Van Buren's inauguration in 1837. Julia Tyler, second wife of John Tyler, requested its use to announce the arrival of the president. Her successor as first lady, Sarah Childress Polk, encouraged its regular use in this manner after it was used at James Polk's inauguration; William Seale says, "Polk was not an impressive figure, so some announcement was necessary to avoid the embarrassment of his entering a crowded room unnoticed. At large affairs the band ... rolled the drums as they played the march ... and a way was cleared for the President."

During the American Civil War (1861–1865) the piece was also used to announce the arrival of Confederate President Jefferson Davis. On October 3, 1861, Davis visited with Generals P. G. T. Beauregard, Joseph Eggleston Johnston, and Gustavus Woodson Smith at Fairfax Court House (now Fairfax, Virginia) for a Council of War.  While at Fairfax, President Davis also conducted a formal Review of the Troops, which numbered some 30,000. At the start of the review, the band of the 1st Virginia Infantry struck up "Hail to the Chief" and concluded with "Dixie".

President Chester A. Arthur did not like the song and asked John Philip Sousa to compose a new song, which was entitled "Presidential Polonaise".  After Arthur left office, the Marine Band resumed playing "Hail to the Chief" for public appearances by the president.

In 1954, the Department of Defense made it the official tribute to the president. The 1969 hit anti-Vietnam war single, "Fortunate Son", by the American rock group Creedence Clearwater Revival, specifically named "Hail to the Chief" when referring to patriots and jingoists.

In his 1990 Broadway musical Assassins, composer Stephen Sondheim uses variations on "Hail To The Chief", most notably in the opening of the show where he switched it from its "traditional march beat into 3/4 time, a carnival waltz" to emphasise "its more sinister elements".

Lyrics

Lyrics that were written by Albert Gamse are set to James Sanderson's music, but they are rarely sung.

The original lyrics, written by Sir Walter Scott, read:

See also
 "Hail, America"
 United States military music customs
 Ave Maria (Schubert)

References

Further reading
Collins, Ace. Songs Sung, Red, White, and Blue: The Stories Behind America's Best-Loved Patriotic Songs.  HarperResource, 2003.

External links

 Ruffles and flourishes with "Hail to the Chief" (MP3)
 Library of Congress Performing Arts Encyclopedia "Hail to the chief (Song Collection)"

American marches
American patriotic songs
Works by British musicians
Presidency of the United States
Songs with lyrics by Albert Gamse
Articles containing video clips
History of Philadelphia
Songs based on poems
Adaptations of works by Walter Scott
1812 songs